The Bantamweight competition at the 2022 IBA Women's World Boxing Championships was held from 9 to 20 May 2022.

Results

Finals

Top half

Section 1
First round fights

Section 2

Bottom half

Section 3

Section 4
First round fights

References

External links
Draw

Bantamweight